The Chaplin family is a multinational acting family. They are the descendants of Hannah Harriet Pedlingham Hill, mother of Sydney John Chaplin (born Sydney John Hill), Sir Charles Spencer "Charlie" Chaplin Jr., and George Wheeler Dryden.

Members
The members of the Chaplin family include: 
Charles Spencer Chaplin Sr. (1863–1901)
Hannah Pedlingham Hill (1865–1928); three sons

Sydney John Chaplin (1885–1965), born Sydney John Hill; alleged son of Sydney Hawkes; two marriages, no children
Charles Spencer "Charlie" Chaplin Jr. (1889–1977), son of Charles Spencer Chaplin Sr. (1863-1901); four marriages, six sons, five daughters
(i) Mildred Harris (1901–1944), 1 son
Norman Spencer Chaplin (1919–1919), died three days after birth
(ii) Lita Grey (1908–1995), two sons
Charles Spencer Chaplin III (1925–1968)
Susan Maree Chaplin, by Susan Magness; married Scott Newton
Laurissa Maree Chaplin Newton
Allison Mary Chaplin Newton
Tyler David Chaplin Newton
Casey Jackson Chaplin Newton
Sydney Earl Chaplin (1926–2009).
Stéphane C. Chaplin, by French dancer and actor 
Tamara Chaplin
(iii) Paulette Goddard (1910–1990), no children
(iv) Oona O'Neill (1925–1991), daughter of American playwright Eugene O'Neill and Agnes Boulton; 3 sons, 5 daughters.
Geraldine Chaplin (born 1944)
Shane Saura (born 1974), by Carlos Saura
Oona Castilla Chaplin (born 1986), by Patricio Castilla
Michael Chaplin (born 1946)
(i) Patricia Johns
Christian Chaplin (born 1964)
Tim Chaplin (born 1966) 
(ii) Patricia Betaudier
Kathleen Chaplin (born 1975)
Dolores Chaplin (born 1979)
Carmen Chaplin (born 1972)
Tracy Chaplin
George Chaplin
Josephine Chaplin (born 1949)
Charly Sistovaris (born 1971), by Nicholas Sistovaris
1 daughter (born 2011)
Julien Ronet (born 1980), by French actor Maurice Ronet
Arthur Gardin, by archeologist Jean-Claude Gardin.
Victoria Chaplin (born 1951), married Jean-Baptiste Thierrée
Mark Chaplin (born 1971)
Aurélia Thierrée (born 1971)
James Thierrée (born 1974)
Eugene Anthony Chaplin (born 1953)
(i) Bernadette McCready
Kiera Chaplin (born 1982)
Laura Chaplin (born 1987)
Kevin Chaplin
Spencer Chaplin
Shannon Chaplin (born 1992)
(ii) Delgermaa Enkhbat
Oona Chaplin (2007)
Skye Chaplin (2007)
Jane Cecil Chaplin (born 1957), married film producer Ilya Salkind
Orson Chaplin-Salkind (born 1986)
Osceola Salkind (born 1994)
Annette (aka Annie) Emily Chaplin (born 1959)
Christopher Chaplin (born 1962)
George Wheeler Dryden (1892–1957), half-brother of Charlie Chaplin, son of Leo Dryden and Hannah Chaplin (née Hill); married ballerina Alice Chapple; 1 son
Spencer Dryden (1938–2005), musician with Jefferson Airplane. He had 5 grandchildren, Aaron, Lauren, Christen, Meagan, and Jessica Dryden, and 3 sons
Jeffrey Rohan Dryden (born 1966) by Jeannie Davis
Jesse Wheeler Dryden (stage name: Drunkfux) by Sally Mann
Jackson Dryden by Kathy Miller

References

Sources

 
.
American families of English ancestry
English families
Swiss families
Show business families
English expatriates in Switzerland